Svetislav Valjarević (9 July 1911 – 22 September 1996) was a Serbian footballer.

Career
He started playing in the youth team of BSK Belgrade, however when he graduated the Military Academy, he was sent to service to Zagreb in 1930 where he joined HŠK Concordia. A year later after arriving, he won the national championship and was the league top-scorer. Specially noted for his great game vision and dangerous shot, he usually played in the position of right midfielder. When he went to the army conscription to Belgrade, he started playing for BSK Belgrade in the 1937-38 season winning, the 1938-39 Championship. He is remembered as one of the best players of the period when his club, BSK, was dominating the Yugoslav football in the late 1930s.

International career
Beside one match played for the B team, the six matches for the City of Zagreb team and nine for the City of Belgrade team, he played 12 matches for Yugoslavia national football team having scored four times. His debut was on 30 April 1933 in Belgrade against Spain, and his last match was also in Belgrade, on 23 March 1941, against Hungary, that ended drow and he scored the only goal for Yugoslavia.

Honours
Concordia Zagreb
Yugoslav First League: 1931–32
Individual
Yugoslav First League top-scorer: 1931–32 (10 goals)
BSK Belgrade
Yugoslav First League: 1938–39

References

External links
 Profile in Serbian Federation website
 

1911 births
1996 deaths
Footballers from Belgrade
Serbian footballers
Yugoslav footballers
Yugoslavia international footballers
HŠK Concordia players
OFK Beograd players
Yugoslav First League players
Association football midfielders